Sumeng Township is a rural town in Wucheng District of Jinhua, eastern China's Zhejiang province. The town shares a border with Changshan Township to the west, Yafan Town to the east, Qiubin Town to the north, and  Andi Town to the south.

History
Qinghu Township was established in 1950. In 1955 Qinghu Township and Qiubin Township merged to form Chenghu Township. In 1961 it was renamed "Qinghu Commune". In 1984 its name was changed into "Sumeng Township".

Geography
The Yuquan Stream and Mei Stream pass through the town.

Economy
The local economy is primarily based upon pork and local vegetables.

References

Divisions of Wucheng District
Towns of Jinhua